Pedacito de cielo (Little Piece of Heaven) is a Venezuelan telenovela which starred Natalia Streignard and Julio Pereira. It was produced and broadcast on Marte TV in 1993.

Synopsis 
A beautiful, innocent angel and a handsome, worldly man fall in love in Pedacito de cielo (Little Piece of Heaven), an enchanting story where fantasy collides with reality. So strong is their passion that it jeopardizes their destinies. Will Sebastian Henriquez avenge his father's death by risking his life to marry the daughter of his enemies? Or will his love for Angelina, an angel, dissuade him from his plan? Sent to earth on a sacred mission, Angelina cannot be destroyed by those plotting her doom, but her love for Sebastian could lead to her ruin. While Angelina searches for two young lovers to ensure the birth of a miraculous child, Sebastian battles the family who seized control of his father's prosperous toy factory. Hopeless love, malevolence and immeasurable ambition weave a dramatic, yet humorous, and always captivating tale as Sebastian and Angelina search for their Little Piece of Heaven.

Cast 
 Natalia Streignard
 Julio Pereira
 Julie Restifo
 Beatriz Fuentes
 Raquel Castaño
 Rebeca Aleman as Libia Rossi
 Javier Valcarcel

External links
Pedacito de cielo at the Internet Movie Database

1993 telenovelas
Venezuelan telenovelas
1993 Venezuelan television series debuts
1993 Venezuelan television series endings
Spanish-language telenovelas
Television shows set in Caracas